Mard Ko Dard Nahi Hota, released internationally as The Man Who Feels No Pain, is a 2018 Indian Hindi-language action comedy film written and directed by Vasan Bala and produced by Ronnie Screwvala under his banner RSVP Movies. The film stars debutant Abhimanyu Dassani, Radhika Madan, Gulshan Devaiah, Mahesh Manjrekar and Jimit Trivedi.

The film premiered in the Midnight Madness section of the 2018 Toronto International Film Festival, where it won the People's Choice Award: Midnight Madness. The film was also screened at the 2018 MAMI Film Festival where it received standing ovation. The film's story follows a young man who has a rare condition called Congenital insensitivity to pain and strikes out on a quest to vanquish his foes. Bhagyashree's son Abhimanyu Dassani made his acting debut with the film. The film was released in theatres on 21 March 2019 and received positive reviews from critics.

Plot
Surya is diagnosed with a rare disorder named Congential insensitivity to pain (CIP) and is tended to by the odd-couple combination of his father and his mischievous paternal grandfather Ajoba after his mother was killed by chain snatchers when the family was returning home after having Surya as she fell off the bike and died instantly though Surya is not seen crying in pain. The school life is difficult for a boy who doesn't feel pain and is picked on by bullies and Surya finds an unlikely ally in his neighbour, Supri. At home, Surya learns to tend to his own wounds and binges on a whole host of martial arts films on VHS tapes thanks to his grandfather's unique tutelage. The only tape that mesmerises Surya is 100-man karate kumite fought by a mysterious one-legged man called Karate Mani. Surya's foray into vigilantism is to come to the aid of Supri against her abusive father, but that event leads to the family being evicted from the building they lived in, and Surya and Supri are estranged as children. They go their separate ways, each one finding purpose and mentorship in unusual circumstances.

Ajoba encourages Surya to pursue his passion secretly & Surya trains himself by watching VHS videos. Meanwhile, Supri is trained by Karate Mani, whom she meets when she accidentally bumps into his scooter. As a young man, Surya remains as dorky as he was in his childhood because his father will never let him leave the house. When his father finally agrees to let him outside, Surya finds a poster advertising his childhood idol Karate Mani. This poster leads him to the very building where he and Supri had been separated years ago, and it is Supri who is pasting the posters. Both of them don't recognise each other, but he is bedazzled when she fights off thugs to rescue a lady. Later, Surya visits the address mentioned on the poster to meet Karate Mani. He finds him knocked out by his evil twin brother Jimmy, and his assistant calls Supri to help him. They take him to a hospital, where only Supri and Surya are left when the rest of them leave. Later, Supri leaves from the hospital on the insistence by her boyfriend Atul, Mani recovers consciousness, and escapes from the hospital, feeling that the hospital will bill him a bomb for trivial treatment.

Surya chases him and fights off the hospital staff who had come to capture him, and Mani is impressed with his skills. Mani reveals that he and Jimmy were trained by their father, a karate trainer, since they were kids. Mani showed his talent for martial arts and easily won the heart of his father, which made Jimmy jealous. One day, Mani saved Jimmy from a speeding truck, sacrificing his leg in the process. This further elevated Mani in the eyes of his father, and Jimmy is further estranged. After the 100-man kumite, his father gifted his locket to him, whereas Jimmy takes up the path of crime. Imprisoned for one of his crimes, Mani got cozy with Jimmy's girlfriend, and Jimmy caught them red-handed. This incident created a permanent rift between the two, putting Mani in a guilt trap. Later, Jimmy started a security agency and bullied Mani with men and guns from his security agency, taking something from him each time he visited him, while Mani relented out of guilt.

Supri later reveals that Atul won over her parents by taking care of their medical expenses, which sort of forced her to stay with him so that her mother would get adequate medical care. Atul is taking her family to Canada to treat her mother. Supri is falling into the same trap of family burden as her mother bore all her life with her abusive husband, so much so that she doesn't have time to think for herself and no clue about her career. On his previous visit, Jimmy snatches the locket that was given by their father to Mani, and Surya vows to get it back for him. His grandfather tries to dissuade him as it is too dangerous but eventually gives in when he realises that he should not kill this very motivating factor. Surya meets Mani, who refuses to take him to Jimmy, but when Surya stops at nothing, he accompanies him to Jimmy's office. Meanwhile, at the airport just before boarding their flight to Canada, Supri's mother insists that she run away from Atul so that she doesn't go through the same fate of an overbearing husband.

Supri's mother hatches a plan wherein she covers up for the absence of Supri inside the plane and falls unconscious with a heavy dose of insulin once the plane lands in Canada, and once unconscious at the airport, she has to be admitted to hospital to be treated. Supri leaves after some pushing from her mother and goes straight to Jimmy's office, knowing Surya would create some ruckus there. At Jimmy's office, a fight ensues between his staff and the two. Surya easily thrashes most of them, and they are surprised to find that Surya doesn't experience pain, which makes him more lethal. In the ensuing fight, the fire is triggered, and the staff lock them in a room and escape from the building. Supri enters in a nick of time and rescues them. They later take refuge at their old residential complex, where they had spent their childhood, which is deserted for reconstruction, and Ajoba gets them all the essentials like blankets and food. In the morning, they are all captured by Jimmy, who arranges a cruel game, where each one of them has to fight his staff members one-on-one.

The first up is Mani, followed by Supri, Surya, and Ajoba. Supri and Mani knock down a quite a few men before going down. All of them attack Surya barring one, and Surya knocks them all out. Jimmy then sends his last remaining fighter: his best one. Just to quickly end the contest, he changes the rules: a 10-point match where a point is scored with every hit. Surya is injured when his leg is broken by his opponent. Mani throws his crutch for help. Surya decides to break the rule and hits his opponent close to the eye with the crutch, temporarily blinding him and finishes off the match. Jimmy is enraged where he shoots and stabs him. Supri intervenes, snatches the gun and shoots Jimmy dead. Later, Surya wakes up at his home, turned hospital. Supri and Ajoba are next to him. Mani is revealed to be in prison, who owns up to Jimmy's death. Surya goes on to fulfill his father's aspiration to become a chartered accountant. Supri's mother gets treated in Canada, where Supri is now liberated from the burden of her mother's treatment and finally starts thinking of her own self and her career. However, Surya and Supri are shown heading towards their new adventure.

Cast
 Abhimanyu Dassani as Suryaanshu "Surya" Sampat
 Radhika Madan as Supriya "Supri" Bhatnagar
 Gulshan Devaiah as Karate Mani and Jimmy
 Mahesh Manjrekar as Aajoba (grandpa)
 Jimit Trivedi as Jatin Sampat
 Shweta Basu Prasad as Surya's mother
 Elena Kazan as Nandini/Bridget Von Hammersmark
 Sartaaj Kakkar as young Surya
 Riva Arora as young Supri

Production
Director Vasan Bala said that in early 2016, a friend of his told him about a dentist whose patient did not ask for anaesthesia. This triggered the idea of the film to him. He then saw several documentaries and blended it with his childhood stories about martial arts. He said: "The story is about all the films that I grew up on, Bruce Lee, Jackie Chan [..] all the karate classes I had to take." Bala said that the film is a tribute to "all the films that we have seen."
For the preparation of the role, Dassani trained for martial arts for three months before the audition. He also practised swimming, gymnastics, yoga, freehand training, stick fighting and studied human anatomy, injuries, and first aid. Action director and martial arts consultant Prateek Parmar made his acting debut with the film, he also served as the martial arts consultant. Dassani went through one-and-a-half month of auditions with other people. Devaiah learned karate while Madan and Dassani learned mixed martial arts. All of them went through almost eight months of training.

Madan mentioned that she was auditioning for Laila Majnu (2018) when she got to know about Mard Ko Dard Nahi Hota and chose the latter film because of its "uniqueness". She performed all the stunts herself and watched several classic action films for days to familiarise herself with the genre. She was also injured and bruised during the physical training; she also followed a strict diet and a daily routine of exercises.

Pop-culture references 
Pop-culture references fly thick and fast in Vasan Bala's Mard Ko Dard Nahi Hota, in which a man whose medical condition makes him impervious to pain sets out to catch the chain-snatchers that killed his mother. The film's title itself is a reference to a recurring Amitabh Bachchan dialogue in Mard (1985) – "Jo mard hota hai usko dard nahin hota hai". Bala says these references weren't curated, but came about organically. "We didn't want to force-fit anything into the movie. Things kept getting added even while we were shooting."

Film references 
Every film Surya watches: Egged on by his grandfather, Surya becomes obsessed with martial arts movies, watching them on VHS and mimicking the actors' moves. Here are the titles that pop up on his shelf or in his player: Geraftaar (1985), Secret Rivals (1976), Return of The Street Fighter (1974), Big Trouble in Little China (1986), The Crow (1994), Gymkata (1985), The 36th Chamber of Shaolin (1978) and Game of Death (1972).

Every movie poster spotted: City Hunter (1993), The Protector (2005), Bad Taste (1987), Seven Samurai (1954), Rambo (2008) and Rocky (1976).

Aaj Ka Goonda Raj (1992): Surya's parents and grandfather are at the theatre watching the 'It's A Challenge' song from this Ravi Raja Pinisetty film moments before he is born.

The Terminator (1984): Surya briefly toys with the idea of his mother defeating a Terminator before deciding to tell the audience the real story of his birth.

Drunken Master (1978): 'Jaise Drunken Master ka wine, Bruce Lee ka nanchaku, waise tera water backpack,' says Surya's grandfather, cautioning him against getting dehydrated.

Kung Fu Panda (2008): Unable to recall whether he should address the martial arts master as 'Karate Man' or 'Shaolin Master', an overwhelmed Surya blurts out 'Shifu' instead.

Eternal Sunshine Of The Spotless Mind (2004): "The shot of Surya and Karate Mani lying on the ground outside the Country Liquor Bar is a reference to Joel and Clementine lying on the ice in Eternal Sunshine Of The Spotless Mind," says Bala.

Paap Ko Jalakar Raakh Kar Doonga (1988): Surya's catchphrase is the title of this Govinda movie.

Pulp Fiction (1994): Jimmy sipping his drink from a plastic cup is a callback to Jules' (Samuel L. Jackson) drinking from the Big Kahuna Burger cup in the Quentin Tarantino film, says Bala.

Mother India (1957): "Aisi hi hoon, Mother India banne ki koshish nahi kar rahi hoon," says Supri's mother, referencing the famous self-sacrificial mother played by Nargis.

Shahenshah (1988): While Surya is fixated on his role as the (super)hero of his own story, others don't quite see him the same way. He gets called 'Matunga Ka Feroz Khan' and 'Sasta Shahenshah'.

Kaminey (2009): Surya hums a brief snatch of 'Dhan Te Nan' from this Vishal Bhardwaj film when he gives his grandfather a peek at his new costume.

Big Trouble In Little China (1986): Karate Mani's hairstyle was inspired by that of Kurt Russell's character's in this film.

THX 1138 (1971): The (fictional) guideline under which a gun can be obtained at the workplace, cited in the pre-climax sequence, is named after George Lucas's first feature film.

Gangs Of Wasseypur (2012): "Karate Mani ka, Supri ka, sabka badla lega Surya," he says during the final showdown, referencing the iconic dialogue from Anurag Kashyap's film.

Rocky (1976): Is any movie about underdogs really complete without a reference to Sylvester Stallone's seven-film franchise? Surya says he feels like the boxer towards the end of the climactic fight.

All the comics Referenced in the film 
Kick-Ass: Jimmy refers to Supri (Radhika Madan) as Hit Girl, from this Marvel series.

Iron Man: Surya's father calls himself 'Jatin Stark' while sporting what he calls his 'Iron Man' look – a three-piece suit and a beard reminiscent of Robert Downey Jr's character.

Every TV Show Referenced in the film 
WWE: The film's final showdown is titled 'Vidhya Bhavan Royal Rumble'.

Narcos: "Karate Mani's sidekick is named Pablo because Ratheesh, who played the role and is also the film's production designer, is a huge Narcos fan," says Bala. Which brings us to…

What the Characters' Names Reference 
Vaastav (1999): "Mahesh Manjarekar's name in the film is Raghunath Namdeo Shivalkar, which was Sanjay Dutt's name in Vastaav. It appears on the nameplate on the door," says Bala.

Inglorious Basterds (2009): When Surya's father eventually remarries, his new wife, Nandini, introduces herself as Bridget von Hammersmark (Diane Kruger's character in Quentin Tarantino's Inglorious Basterds) during their vows. "There's no real meaning to it. It's just that the name had such a kick to it in the sound design. Who's going to read the subtitles?" asks Bala.

Jaane Bhi Do Yaaro (1983): Kundan Shah - The official who conducts the marriage is named after the Jaane Bhi Do Yaaro (1983) director.

Thalapathi (1991): Surya himself is named after Rajinikanth's character in this Mani Ratnam film.

Karate Mani: Gulshan Devaiah's character was named after a real-life action director from the South, says Bala.

Michael Madana Kama Rajan: The twins' father, Michael Kamaraj, is named after the Kamal Haasan film in which the superstar plays a quadruple role. "Should've named someone in the film Madan. Missed opportunity," says Bala.

What the Characters' Clothes Reference 
Die Hard (1988):  The 'Now I Have A Machine Gun Ho Ho Ho' banyan that Surya wears early in the film has the same slogan as a sweater spotted in this Bruce Willis movie.

Raid 2 (2014): The first time we see the adult Supri, she's wearing a white dress and a brown leather jacket – the same costume Julia Estelle's character Hammer Girl wears in this Indonesian action movie.

Dil Se (1998): When the young Surya runs away from home and tries to board a train, he's wearing a red sweater similar to the one Shah Rukh Khan sports in the opening scene of Mani Ratnam's film – a stylistic choice that came about during the shoot, says Bala.

Apna Desh (1972): The red goggles that Jimmy wears come from the Rajesh Khanna song 'Duniya Mein Logo Ko' in this Jambu film. "While Rajesh Khanna wore a red outfit with green-tinted glasses, here Jimmy wears green or blue suits with red-tinted glasses," says Bala.

Longstreet: Surya's maroon tracksuit and blue shoes reference the clothes worn by Bruce Lee in his TV series.

Every Literary Reference in the Film 
The Jungle Book (1894): Rudyard Kipling's characters become stand-ins for playful insults. Surya's father says he wished for a normal son but got Mowgli instead. In turn, his father asks if Surya calls him 'bagheera' now.

Rumi: The 13th century Persian poet becomes fodder for playful banter between Surya and his childhood friend Supri, who takes digs at people for being unable to even sneeze without mentioning him.

Ali Baba and the 40 Thieves: Ajoba teasingly calls his son-in-law Ali Baba when he's late to a meeting with his fiancée.

What the Music References 
Khel Khel Mein (1986): "Ek main aur ek tu. Dono miley is tarah…Yeh toh hona hi tha," plays early on in the film when a henchman trips and falls.

New Delhi (1956): A sequence of Supri taking on a gang of neighbourhood creeps is set to 'Nakhrewaali' from the Kishore Kumar starrer.

In Rappan Rappi Rap: Back To The Future (1985), Big Trouble In Little China (1986), Enter the Dragon (1973), The Jungle Book, Karan Arjun (1995) Pokemon, Star Wars, Pacman, Bata shoes, Nirma washing powder – all get shoutouts in the song. "Surya's been in isolation for so long that in his head, he's still a kid. All these 90s references, karate films and retro stuff are what his world is about," Karan Kulkarni said in an earlier interview.

In Life Mein Fair Chance Kiska?: The lyric 'Show me the Mani' is a desi twist on a Tom Cruise line in Jerry Maguire (1996). Bruce Lee and The Good, The Bad And The Ugly (1966) are also referenced.

In Shaolin Sky: American hip-hop group Wu-Tang Clan and Japanese mafia members (the Yakuza) get namechecked in this song.

Everything Else 
Kamal Haasan and Rajinikanth: psychopath Jimmy (Gulshan Devaiah) accuses Kung Fu master Mani (also Gulshan Devaiah) of being too "senti" because he's a Kamal Haasan fan, suggesting he should've been a fan of Rajinikanth instead.

Michael Schumacher: "Gaadi zor se chal rahi hai, Schumacher?" Ajoba asks his son-in-law.

The 27 Club: The term refers to a group of popular artistes, such as Kurt Cobain, Amy Winehouse and Jimi Hendrix, who died at the age of 27. Surya alludes to it, saying he could've achieved "legit status" had he only died at that age.

Marketing and release
The official theatrical poster of the film was unveiled on 11 February 2019. The film was released in theatres on 21 March 2019 by RSVP Movies in India, New Zealand, and Australia, and was also released later in Hong Kong, South Korea, Japan, and Taiwan.

The film only played on 375 screens in India due to a dispute with multiplex cinema companies. Producer Ronnie Screwvala claimed that four multiplex chains were imposing unnecessary fees to Hindi films, and he filed a grievance with the Competition Commission of India; in retaliation, INOX Leisure Limited would not play Mard Ko Dard Nahi Hota on any of its screens. These "Virtual Print Fees" originated in 2010 to help cinemas transition from film prints to digital, but have continued longer than they were supposed to.

Home media
The film became available as VOD on China's iQIYI on 4 April 2019, and on Netflix on 22 May 2019.

Soundtrack

The music of the film is composed by Karan Kulkarni and Dipanjan Guha while the lyrics are penned by Garima Obrah, Karan Kulkarni, Shantanu Ghatak and Hussain Haidry.

Reception

Critical response
Rafael Motamayor of Bloody Disgusting called the film "India's highly entertaining answer to Deadpool". J Hurtado of Screen Anarchy wrote: "In this boisterous action comedy, Bala's passions and obsessions are writ large across the screen with a genuine affection that is hard to deny." He later included it in his list of 14 Favorite Indian Films of 2018. 

Joe Leydon of Variety wrote: "Writer-director Vasan Bala's wild and wacky yet also warm and fuzzy fable about a resourceful young man who transcends ostensible physical limitations to become a two-fisted, swift-kicking hero likely will prove to be an irresistible crowd-pleaser on the global fest circuit, and in an international release on various platforms." For Scroll.in, Nandini Ramnath writes, "Vasan Bala's action comedy, which he has also written, plays out at the intersection of cinephilia, nostalgia and mischief." Shikhar Verma of High On Films writes, "Vasan Bala's film has endearing characters who all call for a big celebratory leap forward for conventional Hindi films; but the entire arc that comes along with the self-awareness lacks real oomph or glow."

Stephen Dalton of The Hollywood Reporter called it a "fun ride, unashamedly zany and eager to please, even if the humor is very broad and the sprawling plot too baggy for an action-driven piece." Rahul Desai of Film Companion called it "a Whimsically joyful ode to a life of movies." Pradeep Menon of Firstpost wrote that the film "remains watchable throughout, despite all its shaky foundation, precisely because it gives us an experience we rarely see in Indian cinema." Devesh Sharma of Filmfare giving three stars out of five says, "All-all-all, the film's gags don't travel well outside the context. It's one of those -- ‘you’ve to be there’—kind of films. But within those two hours, you'll surely laugh your head off." Raja Sen of Hindustan Times giving four stars out of five feels that the film is most entertaining action movie in decades.

Awards and nominations

References

External links 
 
 
 

Indian vigilante films
Indian action comedy films
Fiction about diseases and disorders
2010s Hindi-language films
2018 masala films
Indian martial arts films
2018 martial arts films
2018 action comedy films